Lodzia House, also known as HaBayit Ha'adom ('the Red House'), is an historic building located at 43 Nahmani Street in Tel Aviv, Israel.

History 
The building was erected in 1924 by Akiva Aryeh Weiss, one of the founders of Tel Aviv.  It was built as a textile factory by the architectural firm Joseph Berlin & Richard Pacovský, and named Łódź in honor of the Polish industrial city.

The building stood empty for many years before being purchased in 2010 by an Israeli couple, entrepreneur and philanthropist Ronny Douek and actress Yael Abecassis.

Work on the building's restoration began in September, 2013 under the direction of the architectural firm Amnon Bar Or, & Co.

See also
Economy of Israel
Architecture of Israel

References

Buildings and structures in Tel Aviv
Industrial buildings completed in 1924
Jewish businesses established in Mandatory Palestine